Heather Hamill is a sociologist who is currently an associate professor at the University of Oxford, St Cross College. She specializes in the study of crime and extralegal governance. Her book, The Hoods: Crime and Punishment in Belfast, about paramilitary punishment attacks in Northern Ireland, won the James Donnelly Sr. Prize for Books in History and Social Sciences, awarded by the American Conference for Irish Studies. According to the award committee:

Works

References

Fellows of St Cross College, Oxford
Sociologists of deviance
Living people
Year of birth missing (living people)